The Trouble with Being Myself is the third studio album by American singer and songwriter Macy Gray, released on April 28, 2003, by Epic Records. The album peaked at number 44 on the Billboard 200, and by February 2007, it had sold 134,000 copies in the United States. Despite not being a major commercial success, The Trouble with Being Myself received mostly positive reviews. The album spawned the single "When I See You".

Track listing

Notes
  signifies a co-producer
  signifies a vocal producer

Personnel
Credits adapted from the liner notes of The Trouble with Being Myself.

Musicians

 Macy Gray – vocals ; backing vocals 
 Dallas Austin – ARP, guitar ; programming ; backing vocals 
 Scott Breadman – percussion 
 DJ Kiilu Grand – programming ; turntables 
 Fanny Franklin – backing vocals 
 Victor Indrizzo – drums ; guitar ; guitar loops 
 Adam MacDougall – Moog ; Hammond ; piano 
 Justin Meldal-Johnsen – bass ; backing vocals 
 Audra Cunningham Nishita – backing vocals 
 Mark Ronson – guitar ; programming, turntables 
 Jeremy Ruzumna – Wurlitzer ; synthesizer ; piano ; turntables ; programming ; Moog ; Hammond ; clavinet ; Chamberlin ; organ 
 Sy Smith – backing vocals ; choir leader 
 Beck – backing vocals, guitar 
 Dawn Beckman – backing vocals ; choir leader 
 Pharoahe Monch – backing vocals 
 Chino Smith – backing vocals 
 David Campbell – string arrangements 
 Jinsoo Lim – guitar 
 Zac Rae – Rhodes ; Chamberlin ; Farfisa ; piano ; clavinet, organ ; Wurlitzer ; tack piano ; synthesizer 
 Rick Shepherd – programming 
 Printz Board – flugelhorn ; trumpet 
 Arik Marshall – guitar 
 Tom "Tombone" Rawls – trombone 
 Danielle Thomas – backing vocals 
 Tracy Wannomae – bass clarinet ; saxophone 
 Marsha Ambrosius – backing vocals ; opera vocals 
 Steve Baxter – trombone 
 Charles Green – saxophone 
 Mike Harris – trumpet 
 Natalie Stewart – backing vocals 
 Chris Thomas – bass 
 Darryl Swann – programming ; guitar 
 Bobby Ross Avila – backing vocals ; piano 
 Traci Nelson – backing vocals 
 Dave Rolicke – saxophone, trombone 
 Ericka Yancey – backing vocals 
 Logan Duntzelman – kids choir 
 Aanisah Hinds – kids choir 
 Happy Hinds – kids choir 
 Tahmel Hinds – kids choir 
 Courtney Johnson – kids choir 
 Joia Johnson – kids choir 
 Chris Richardson – kids choir 
 Sonny Swann – kids choir 
 Marina Bambino – percussion ; backing vocals 
 Herb Graham Jr. – drums 
 Lukas Haas – acoustic guitar, backing vocals 
 Dave Wilder – bass 
 Rama Duke – backing vocals 
 Mike Elizondo – bass 
 Esthero – backing vocals 
 Kam Talbert – backing vocals 
 Israel Avila – programming

Technical

 Dallas Austin – co-production ; executive production
 Dave Way – co-production ; recording, mixing, Pro Tools 
 Darryl Swann – vocal production ; co-production 
 Thom Russo – additional mixing ; Pro Tools 
 DJ Kiilu Grand – co-production 
 Chris Wonzer – additional engineering ; engineering assistance 
 Macy Gray – production
 Mike Melnick – additional engineering
 Neil Ward – additional engineering
 Tim Lauber – engineering assistance
 Christine Sirois – engineering assistance
 Ted Jensen – mastering

Artwork
 Hooshik – art direction, design
 David LaChapelle – photography

Charts

Certifications and sales

Release history

References

2003 albums
Albums produced by Dallas Austin
Epic Records albums
Macy Gray albums